Antoine Payen the Elder (1748–1798) was a Belgian architect and army engineers officer who designed several châteaux and villas in what were then the Austrian Netherlands. His best known work is the Belvédère Castle. He initially collaborated with Charles de Wailly. His son Antoine Payen the Younger was a painter and naturalist.

Architects of the Austrian Netherlands
1748 births
1798 deaths